The Towns County Jail, also known as Old Towns County Jail, in Hiawassee, Georgia was built in 1935-36 by the Federal Emergency Relief Administration and modified in 1981.  It was listed on the National Register of Historic Places in 1985.  As of 1985, the building served as Hiawassee City Hall.

It is a two-story rock building with a hipped roof.

The Towns County Herald noted in 1936 that the completed jail was a "'modern, safe, sanitary, and commendable structure'" and praised Ordinary J. F. Johnson for his work building the jail, which cost $4,353 in total.  It served as Towns County's jail until the 1970s, when a joint jail shared with Union County was built.

It was one of seven county jails reviewed for National Register listing in 1985.

References

Jails on the National Register of Historic Places in Georgia (U.S. state)
Government buildings completed in 1935
National Register of Historic Places in Towns County, Georgia
Jails in Georgia (U.S. state)